Concepción is a district of the Atenas canton, in the Alajuela province of Costa Rica.

Geography 
Concepción has an area of  km2 and an elevation of  metres.

Demographics 

For the 2011 census, Concepción had a population of  inhabitants.

Transportation

Road transportation 
The district is covered by the following road routes:
 National Route 3
 National Route 27
 National Route 134
 National Route 720

References 

Districts of Alajuela Province
Populated places in Alajuela Province